David John Hugh Cockayne FRS FInstP (19 March 1942 – 22 December 2010) was Professor in the physical examination of materials in the Department of Materials at the University of Oxford and professorial fellow at Linacre College from 2000 to 2009. He was the president of the International Federation of Societies for Microscopy from 2003 till 2007, then vice-president 2007 to 2010.

Cockayne was an electron microscopist who played an important role in the development of weak-beam transmission electron microscopy (TEM), and in the application of high resolution TEM to diamond, fullerenes and semiconductors.

Biography

Cockayne was born in Balham, London, the second of three children of John Henry Cockayne, policeman and later staff manager, and his wife, Ivy, née Hatton. In 1950, when he was 8, the family sailed from Tilbury on the Otranto, bound for Melbourne; their new home was to be in the Geelong area of Victoria. In 1952 they moved to a newly-built house in Geelong, and Cockayne attended a new school, from where he was awarded a scholarship to Geelong Grammar School in 1953, where he excelled in chemistry, physics and mathematics.

In 1961 Cockayne enrolled at the University of Melbourne to read physics; he graduated in 1964 with first-class honours. He went on to do research on electron diffraction for an MSc, again gaining a first in 1966. He was then awarded a Commonwealth Scholarship to read for a DPhil at Magdalen College, Oxford.

David joined the Department of Metallurgy in Oxford in September 1966 to conduct research on electron microscope images of defects in crystal lattices, under the supervision of Dr M J Whelan. He was awarded a DPhil in 1970.

At the age of 32, Cockayne  took up the post of director of the University of Sydney Electron Microscope Unit (EMU) in June 1974. He also held the position of associate professor. He was promoted to full professor in 1986, and then to a personal chair (Professor in Physics (Electron Microscopy and Microanalysis)) in 1992. He built up an important research base at Sydney; with  David McKenzie he developed a high-precision electron diffraction technique within an electron microscope to study the structure of amorphous materials.

Cockrayne moved back to Oxford in 2000, to take up the post of Professor in the Physical Examination of Materials, at the Department of Materials. He also became Professorial Fellow at Linacre College. In the department of materials he “built up an outstanding electron microscopy group”, and followed up studies started in Sydney on the properties of nanometer-sized crystals (quantum dots) insemiconductor alloys.

The man and his family

“Cockayne was an inspirational lecturer and mentor. He cared deeply about research, teaching, and university administration, and brought lucidity and commitment in equal measure to all three.” […] His interests included “theatre, music, literature, photography, travel, and bushwalking”.
When he was an undergraduate at Trinity College, Melbourne University he met Jean Kerr, who enrolled a year after Cockrayne and was reading French and English honours. She was resident in the next-door hall, and they got to know each other early in 1962 and became close friends in 1964 Shortly before he left for Oxford in September 1966, he proposed to Jean and they announced their engagement. She travelled to England in January 1967, and they were married in Shilton, Oxfordshire on 28 July 1967. The couple had three children: Sophie was born in Oxford in 1973; Tamsin in Sydney in 1975; and James in Sydney in 1977. 

David Cockayne died from lung cancer on 22 December 2010. He was cremated in Oxford following a funeral service at the University Church of St Mary the Virgin on 5 January 2011. He wrote his own eulogy to give himself 'the pleasure of knowing what will have been said at my funeral'.

Honours and distinctions

When Cockayne was elected a Fellow of the Royal Society (FRS) in 1999 his certificate of election noted that he was:

References

British physicists
Microscopists
Fellows of the Royal Society
1942 births
2010 deaths
Place of birth missing
Fellows of the Institute of Physics
Presidents of the International Federation of Societies for Microscopy
Fellows of Linacre College, Oxford
Statutory Professors of the University of Oxford